Othman Chehaibi (born 23 December 1954) is a Tunisian football forward who played for Tunisia in the 1978 FIFA World Cup. He also played for Jeunesse Sportive Kairouanaise.

References

External links
FIFA profile

1954 births
Tunisian footballers
Tunisia international footballers
Association football forwards
1978 FIFA World Cup players
1978 African Cup of Nations players
Living people
JS Kairouan players